Michael Žantovský (born 3 January 1949, Prague) is a Czech diplomat, politician, author, journalist, lyricist and psychologist. He is a former Ambassador of the Czech Republic to the United Kingdom, as well as to Israel and the United States.

Education, background, scientific work
Born in Prague in a literary family, he was educated at the Faculty of Arts of the Charles University, Prague (B.A. summa cum laude in clinical and social psychology, 1973) and McGill University, Montreal.  From 1973 until 1980 he worked in the Psychiatric Research Institute in Prague, where he did research in the fields of theory of motivation and sexual behavior. He left the Institute in 1980 and worked as a free-lance translator, lyricist and publicist. He contributed to the underground press. In 1988-89 he worked as the Prague correspondent for Reuters, the international news agency.

With his first wife, playwright and journalist Kristina Žantovská, they have a daughter Ester (*1980) and son Jonáš (*1984). With his second wife, Jana Žantovská, an award-winning photographer working under the nom de plume Jane Noseková, they have a son David (*2001) and daughter Rebeka (*2003).

Political and diplomatic career

During the Velvet Revolution in 1989 he was among the founding members of the Civic Forum, the umbrella organization coordinating the overthrow of the communist regime, and became its press spokesman. In January 1990 he became the spokesman, press secretary and advisor to President Václav Havel. From 1992 until 1997 he served as the Ambassador of Czechoslovakia and subsequently (from January 1993) the Czech Republic in the United States.

In November 1996, he was elected to the Czech Senate in a Prague district. From 1996 until 2002 he was the Chairman of the Senate Committee on Foreign Affairs, Defense and Security. He initiated and co-drafted, inter alia, the Czech Freedom of Information Act of 1999.

In March 1997, he was elected leader of the Civic Democratic Alliance (ODA), a liberal conservative party, member of the governing coalition. He was the Vice-president of the party from 1998 until 2001, when he was again elected the party's leader.

In 2002, he returned to the Czech Foreign Service. From 2003 until 2009 he served as the Ambassador of the Czech Republic to the State of Israel. Since October 2009 until September 2015, he was the Ambassador of the Czech Republic to the United Kingdom.

In 2003, he was the co-founder and first executive director of the Program of Atlantic Security Studies (PASS), a part of the think-tank Prague Security Studies Institute (PSSI).

Since July 2012, Žantovský served as President of the Aspen Institute Prague and member of the Board of Trustees of the Aspen Institute.. He is now the Honorary President of Aspen Institute Central Europe.

Since September 2015, he is the Director of the Václav Havel Library. He is also a member of the board of the New York-based Vaclav Havel Library Foundation.

Literary work
He translated more than fifty works of fiction, drama and poetry, of mostly contemporary American and British writers, including works by James Baldwin, Norman Mailer, Joseph Heller, E.L. Doctorow, Nadine Gordimer, Toni Morrison, Tom Stoppard et al. He translated films and short stories of Woody Allen, and wrote a monograph on his life and work (1990). He translated also non-fiction works by Henry Kissinger, Madeleine Albright, Joshua Muravchik et al. From Hebrew he translated the memoirs of Amos Oz A Tale of Love and Darkness.

With his first wife he co-authored a play, The Poor Mouth (1985) based on a short novel by Myles na gCopaleen (Brian O'Nolan).

He has written and published many essays and articles on foreign policy, current affairs and literature. He co-authored the book Freedom of Information in the Legal System of the Czech Republic (2002).

In 2014, his biography of Václav Havel has been published both in Czech and English (Atlantic Books) and subsequently in more than ten other languages.

References

External links
 Embassy of the Czech Republic in the UK
 Senate of the Parliament of the Czech Republic
 Embassy Czech London Facebook
 
 Aspen Institute Prague
 

1949 births
Living people
Diplomats from Prague
Czech male writers
Czech journalists
Czech psychologists
Charles University alumni
McGill University Faculty of Science alumni
Ambassadors of the Czech Republic to the United States
Civic Democratic Alliance Senators
Leaders of the Civic Democratic Alliance
Ambassadors of the Czech Republic to Israel